Yves Clausse (born 4 February 1969) is a Luxembourgian swimmer. He competed at the 1988 Summer Olympics and the 1992 Summer Olympics.

References

External links
 

1969 births
Living people
Luxembourgian male swimmers
Olympic swimmers of Luxembourg
Swimmers at the 1988 Summer Olympics
Swimmers at the 1992 Summer Olympics
People from Ettelbruck
20th-century Luxembourgian people
21st-century Luxembourgian people